Cohen Stadium was a stadium on the Northeast side of El Paso, Texas, by the Patriot Freeway, next to the Franklin Mountains. It replaced Dudley Field and has been replaced by Southwest University Park.  It was primarily used for baseball, and was the home field of the El Paso Diablos minor league baseball team.  It opened in 1990 and held 9,725 people. A demolition contract for the stadium was awarded on April 2, 2019, to be completed in 120 days. Demolition took place on Wednesday, June 5, 2019. The site will become the Cohen Entertainment District, featuring a water park, open spaces, shopping and restaurants.

The park was known as being an extremely hitter-friendly park, due to its high elevation, low humidity, and favorable wind currents toward the outfield. Primarily used for baseball, Cohen Stadium also hosted concerts, boxing, and soccer games.  In 2012, it was home to the El Paso Santos minor-league soccer team playing from February until April, but despite being Pecos Soccer League (PSL) champions, they were displaced by the Diablos' departure.

Cohen Stadium was named for the former Major League Baseball players Andy Cohen and his brother Syd Cohen who grew up in El Paso.

In December 2009, the stadium's cement canopy was partially torn away by heavy winds in El Paso.  Winds of the storm which caused the damage exceeded 70 mph.

World famous DJ Tiësto made an appearance at Cohen Stadium on May 6, 2011 with an estimated attendance of 10,000 people.

Cohen Stadium hosted the first annual Sun City Music Festival on September 3 and 4, 2011. The festival was dedicated to the world's largest electronic-dance music artists having headliners such as Armin van Buuren, Paul van Dyk, Afrojack, Funkagenda, Sander van Doorn among others. In 2012, SCMF was moved to Ascarate Park.

References

Baseball venues in El Paso, Texas
Baseball venues in Texas
Defunct minor league baseball venues
1990 establishments in Texas
2019 disestablishments in Texas
Sports venues completed in 1990
Sports venues demolished in 2019